Taira no Tsunemori (1124–1185) was the 3rd son of Taira no Tadamori and a younger half-brother of Taira no Kiyomori. He committed suicide with his younger brother, Taira no Norimori, at the Battle of Dan-no-ura, the last battle of the Genpei War.

1124 births
1185 deaths
People of Heian-period Japan
Japanese military personnel who committed suicide
Suicides by drowning in Japan
Taira clan